The December 2015 Chad suicide bombings occurred on 5 December 2015 when four suicide bombers at Lake Chad kill at least 15 people and another 130 were injured. Four women carried out the attack at a weekly market on an island on the Chadian side of the lake. No group has claimed responsibility; officials suspect the attacks were carried out by members of the Boko Haram militant group from neighboring Nigeria.

References

Terrorist incidents in Chad in 2015
Mass murder in 2015
December 2015 crimes in Africa